Council Directive No. 89/104/EEC (Repealed by EU Directive 2008/95/EC), to approximate the laws of the Member States relating to trade marks, was introduced into European Union law on 21 December 1988. Its provisions were required to be introduced into national law by 29 December 1991. On this date, the Directive therefore became law with direct effect in each of the member states of the European Union.

Intention
The Directive is intended to approximate the laws of the Member States of the European Union which relate to trade marks and to harmonise disparities in the respective trade mark laws which have the potential to impede the free movement of goods and provision of services, or to distort competition within the European Union.

The Directive provided a framework of minimum provisions applicable throughout the European Union but did not seek to impose onerous obligations on national trademark registries. For example, the Directive did not stipulate how member states should deal with the registration, revocation and invalidity of trademarks. These elements were left to the national bodies' discretion.

Transposition
In the UK the Directive was transposed into domestic law by sections 5(3) and 10(3) of the Trade Marks Act 1994.

Grounds for refusal or invalidity
The Directive stipulates that signs cannot be registered if they are: 
 Devoid of distinctive character 
 Indicate the kind, quality, or other characteristics of the goods or services they represent
 Are customary signs in the trade
 Contrary to public policy
 Deceitful

See also
 Windsurfing Chiemsee Produktions v. Boots

References

External links 
Text of directive with headers (html)
Text of the directive (pdf)

European Union directives
Intellectual property law of the European Union
1988 in law
1988 in the European Economic Community